Actinic rays may refer to:
 Ultraviolet
 Actinism